Bishop John J. Snyder High School is a private Roman Catholic college preparatory high school in Jacksonville, Florida, United States. It was established in 2002 and located in the Roman Catholic Diocese of St. Augustine. It is named for John J. Snyder, bishop of the diocese from 1979 to 2000.

History 
Bishop Snyder was established in 2002 to serve the growing Catholic population in the west Jacksonville area. The school was established on a 50-acre site with a cost of $11 million. It is named after Bishop John J. Snyder who had retired as the eighth Bishop of the Diocese of St. Augustine in 2000. The first students at Bishop Snyder were 75 freshmen in 2002.

Alumni
Ross Minor (2016) - shooting survivor, accessibility *Shawn Schmieder (2007) - Former offensive lineman on the Florida Gators
Andrew R. Nicholas (2007) - Historian and author
content creator, former Paralympic swimmer

References 

Roman Catholic Diocese of Saint Augustine
High schools in Jacksonville, Florida
Catholic secondary schools in Florida
Education in Jacksonville, Florida
Educational institutions established in 2002
2002 establishments in Florida